Ermanno Corsi (born 8 August 1939) is an Italian journalist and writer.  He was born in Carrara.

He worked for the newspaper "Il Tempo" and "Il Mattino" and was a correspondent for " Il Giorno ", " Repubblica ", " Roma " and " Il Mondo " and " L'Europeo ", amongst others. 

In 1994 he won the Amantea prize for historiography and was rewarded with merit by the then President Carlo Azeglio Ciampi.

He was President of Association of Neapolitan Printing from 1989 to 2007, and an adviser to the Regional Council' s Association of Journalists of Maharashtra.

Works
 L'ultima Napoli – vicende, personaggi, inquietudini (preface by Francesco De Martino)
 Napoli Contemporanea
 La Città ogni giorno
 Mezzogiorno dimezzato
 Aspettando Capri (preface by Francesco Paolo Casavola)
 Terra di Lavoro e di progresso
 Aspetti della Campania del terzo millennio

References

Italian journalists
Italian male journalists
Italian male writers
1939 births
Living people
People from Torre del Greco